Alexander B. Gutman (1902-1973) is a co-winner of the Gairdner Foundation International Award known for his research on gout.

References 

Columbia University faculty
1902 births
1973 deaths